Bachelor in Paradise is a 1961 American Metrocolor romantic comedy film starring Bob Hope and Lana Turner. Directed by Jack Arnold, it was written by Valentine Davies and Hal Kanter, based on a story by Vera Caspary.

It co-stars Paula Prentiss, Jim Hutton and Janis Paige.

The film won three Laurel awards for Best Comedy, Best Comedy Actor (Hope) and song ("Bachelor in Paradise", music: Henry Mancini and lyrics: Mack David), which was also nominated for Academy Award for Best Original Song. Bob Hope was also nominated for the Golden Globe Award for Best Actor – Motion Picture Musical or Comedy.

Strangely for a very American film, Bachelor in Paradise had its World Premiere at the Coliseum Theatre in London's West End on November 2, 1961, with a personal appearance from Bob Hope (although Hope himself was born in Britain).

Plot
A.J. Niles is a provocative best-selling author who discovers that he has a large tax debt owed to the IRS, due to being ripped off by his accountant, Herman Wapinger. He goes undercover under the alias "Jack Adams" in a California suburban community called, "Paradise Village", to research a new book about the wives and lives there. Niles is pursued by a flirtatious married woman named, "Dolores", while falling in love with a woman, Rosemary, who rents her house to him. Wapinger is found, Niles' cash is returned to him, and he reveals his true identity on national television.  The husbands in Paradise Village all file for divorce, believing their wives are all having affairs with Niles.  In divorce court, Niles reveals that he is in love with Rosemary and asks her to marry him.  Everyone lives happily ever after.

Cast
 Bob Hope as  Adam J. Niles (Jack Adams)
 Lana Turner as  Rosemary Howard
 Janis Paige as  Dolores Jynson
 Jim Hutton as  Larry Delavane
 Paula Prentiss as  Linda Delavane
 Don Porter as  Thomas W. Jynson
 Virginia Grey as  Camille Quinlaw
 Agnes Moorehead as  Judge Peterson
 Florence Sundstrom as  Mrs. Pickering
 John McGiver as  Austin Palfrey
 Clinton Sunberg as  Rodney Jones
 Alan Hewitt as  Attorney Backett
 Reta Shaw as  Mrs. Brown
 Vin Scully as himself

Production

The script was based on an original story for the movies by Vera Caspary – a 70-page document.

The film was Bob Hope's first with MGM. He was persuaded to star in it by head of production Sol Siegel. The film marked Lana Turner's first romantic comedy in a number of years.

George Marshall was originally signed to direct.

Paula Prentiss and Jim Hutton were signed off the back of their success together in Where the Boys Are. MGM put them in three films: this, The Horizontal Lieutenant and The Honeymoon Machine and pushed them as a new William Powell and Myrna Loy.

Filming took place in May 1961.

Reception
MGM was impressed by the film and signed Jack Arnold to direct for them for five years.

Proposed Sequel
Before the film was released they requested Hal Kanter to start writing a sequel, An Armful of Girls, with Hope as a married man chased over Europe by titled ladies. This was never made.

Critical
The Los Angeles Times called the film "frequently diverting".

The New York Times said the movie "has enough sharp gags to make [Hope's] recent TV spectaculars unspectacular even though the romantic antics on which it is all pegged are somewhat less than inspired. This pleasantly varicolored 'Paradise' may not be heavenly but its mild fun and frolics should keep a viewer reasonably happy."

Box Office
According to MGM records, the film earned $2.5 million in the US and Canada and $1 million elsewhere but ultimately lost $344,000.

Ann-Margret
The title song for the film was nominated for an Oscar. It was performed by Ann-Margret at the Oscar's ceremony, and reception to this greatly boosted her career.

See also
 List of American films of 1961

References

External links
 
 
 
 Bachelor in Paradise at Turner Classic Movies Spotlight by Frank Miller
 

1961 films
1961 romantic comedy films
American romantic comedy films
1960s English-language films
Films directed by Jack Arnold
Films set in California
Metro-Goldwyn-Mayer films
Films scored by Henry Mancini
Films based on works by Vera Caspary
1960s American films